Legislative elections were held in El Salvador on 14 March 1976. The result was a victory for the ruling National Conciliation Party, which was the only party to contest the elections  due to a boycott by the opposition as a result of massive electoral fraud.

Results

References

Bibliography
Political Handbook of the world, 1976. New York, 1977. 
Herman, Edward S. and Frank Brodhead. 1984. Demonstration elections: U.S.-staged elections in the Dominican Republic, Vietnam, and El Salvador. Boston: South End Press.
Montgomery, Tommie Sue. 1995. Revolution in El Salvador: from civil strife to civil peace. Boulder: Westview.
Webre, Stephen. 1979. José Napoleón Duarte and the Christian Democratic Party in Salvadoran Politics 1960-1972. Baton Rouge: Louisiana State University Press.

Legislative elections in El Salvador
1976 in El Salvador
El Salvador
One-party elections
Election and referendum articles with incomplete results